Michelle Georgina Mone, Baroness Mone,  (née Allan; born October 1971) is a Scottish businesswoman and Conservative life peer. She has set up several businesses, including MJM International Ltd in 1996 and the lingerie company Ultimo along with her then husband Michael Mone. Other ventures include naturopathic 'weight-loss' pills, and a fake tan product via Ultimo Beauty.

Mone became a Conservative life peer in 2015. From 2020 to 2022, in a series of investigative pieces, The Guardian reported that Mone and her children had secretly received £29 million of profits to an offshore trust from government PPE contracts, which she had lobbied for during the COVID-19 pandemic. The House of Lords Commissioner for Standards and National Crime Agency launched investigations into Mone's links to these contracts in January 2022. Mone announced in December that year that she was taking a leave of absence from the House of Lords "to clear her name" amid the allegations.

Early life
Born in October 1971, Michelle Allan grew up in Glasgow's East End. She recounted how she had lived with her family in a one-bedroom house with no bath or shower until she was 10 years old. She also told of how her younger brother, who had spina bifida, died at the age of eight, when she was 10 years old, and that her father, who was suffering from cancer, lost the use of his legs when she was 15.

She left school aged 15, with no qualifications, to pursue a modelling career. At 17 she met her future husband, Michael Mone, and by 18 years old, she was pregnant with her first child, Rebecca. She then converted from Protestantism to Catholicism and married Michael, an anaesthetist's son from a Catholic family.

Business career
Mone obtained a marketing job with the Labatt brewing company and, within two years, had risen to become its head of marketing in Scotland. She has since said that she invented qualifications to help get the job there. She was then made redundant by the company, prompting her, at the age of 23, to set up her own business using the redundancy compensation she received from Labatt.

MJM International
In November 1996 she founded MJM International with her then-husband Michael. In August 1999, Mone launched the Ultimo lingerie brand at Selfridges department store in London. Mone came up with the idea for the Ultimo bra, the brand's first product, when she was wearing an uncomfortable cleavage-enhancing bra one day and believed she could create a more comfortable cleavage-enhancing bra. Mone had read about a new silicone product while on holiday in Florida and approached the company to obtain its European licence to produce bras. Mone has claimed that an Ultimo bra was worn by Julia Roberts in the Hollywood movie, Erin Brockovich, but this was denied by the film's creators. Ultimo went on to include other products, such as backless dresses and shapewear, which led to MJM International's growth.

Mone left MJM International briefly in 2013 following the breakdown of her relationship with her then husband. The business assets were transferred to its parent firm, Ultimo Brands International Ltd, in a partnership with MAS Holdings. MJM International was then dissolved. In November 2014, Mone sold down her stake in Ultimo Brands International to 20% to partner MAS Holdings. In 2014, a former operations director for MJM won a claim for unfair dismissal from her company after discovering that Mone had authorised electronic bugging of his office. 

Mone threatened to sue her critics when it was revealed her company MJM International had paid a substantial sum of money into a controversial tax avoidance scheme, criticised by Chancellor George Osborne as "morally repugnant". Following a test case brought by HMRC against Rangers Football Club, the scheme utilising an employee benefit trust (the type of tax avoidance scheme used by MJM International) was exposed as ineffective in November 2015. Mone said she had "not done anything wrong" in relation to tax avoidance and that her ex-husband had "dealt with all the finance". In August 2015, Mone resigned her directorships of both MJM and Ultimo, saying she had sold 80% of the latter.

TrimSecrets and weight loss
TrimSecrets were weight loss pills formulated by the “naturopath” Jan de Vries. The product also used diet and exercise advice. In 2006 MJM formed a joint venture with de Vries, taking a 50% share in the product. Mone claimed that exercise and reduced calorific intake had no effect on her weight and credited TrimSecrets pills for her weight loss. Mone falsely claimed the efficacy of the product had been proven in clinical trials. However, when questioned further, she said that approximately 60 users had completed a questionnaire but was unable to produce the results.

In October 2013, Jan de Vries sold his interest in the company with Mone having 60% of the business and a silent business partner the remaining 40%. In August 2015 it was reported that the company had made a loss in each of the last four years for which accounts were available.

In November 2015, Mone was criticised for using her "Baroness Mone"-styled Twitter account to promote TrimSecrets pills, although a spokesman for Mone said she had disposed of her ownership of the firm before her tweet. A spokesman for the British Dietetic Association said "there is no scientific basis or rationale for these products, they are making claims which are unfounded and feeding into public confusion around nutrition and pseudo-science."

On the ITV programme Loose Women in 2020, Mone said she lost weight during the COVID-19 lockdown by exercising three times a day. She stated: "When I was overweight and in a very uncomfortable horrible marriage, my way of coping with that was to continuously eat."

Ultimo Beauty/Ubeauty Global
In 2012 Mone's company, Ultimo Beauty, launched a fake tan product. In 2014 when announcing that she had sold most of her stake in Ultimo, she confirmed she had taken 100% control of Ubeauty Global, consisting of the assets of Ultimo Beauty.

In 2016, after she was made a peer, Mone changed the company formation so that it no longer had to publish public trading accounts. In February 2017 accounts for the company were published, covering the time from 2014 to 2016 and it was revealed the company had assets of £23,000. In March 2017, Mone announced that she had sold the company.

Aston Plaza development

In 2017, Mone and her partner Doug Barrowman launched a £250 million residential development in Dubai which they claimed was to be the "first-ever development to be priced in bitcoin". In April 2019, The Sunday Times reported that the development was "on hold" with the construction incomplete, while a spokesman for Mone said that it was going "extremely well" and was in the process of being redesigned.

Equi cryptocurrency

In 2018, Mone and her partner Doug Barrowman launched a cryptocurrency called Equi through a company called Equi Capital. It aimed to raise $80m which would be invested in startup companies. Mone described herself as "one of the biggest experts in Cryptocurrency and Blockchain" and promoted the project as the "bitcoin of Britain". The company recruited 1,000 people to promote the cryptocurrency through social media, but they only raised £1,600. According to Barrowman, £5.4 million of tokens were sold in a "pre-sale offering" but the public sale beginning in March 2018 raised only £540,000. By August 2018, The Sunday Times reported that the project had "flopped" and all investors had been refunded. The Financial Times reported that it had "ended in a fiasco that exposes the total absence of oversight in the ICO market".

Political career 
Mone says she previously supported the Labour Party, as did her family, but withdrew her support in 2009 after the prime minister, Gordon Brown, increased the top income tax rate to 50%, also indicating that she would leave the UK. She further stated that Brown and his government mismanaged the country's finances during the global economic crisis. 

During the London riots in August 2011, Mone called for the army to be brought in and tweeted "People who riot, steal, cover face deserve zero human rights". In January 2012, she gave an interview to The Sunday Times stating her intention to move herself and her business to England were Scotland to become independent following the 2014 referendum on the issue. However, despite Scotland voting No in the referendum, Mone confirmed a few months later that she was leaving Scotland.

On 10 August 2015, the government announced that Mone would lead a two-part review into entrepreneurship and small businesses, particularly focusing upon setting up small businesses in deprived areas, under the Work and Pensions Secretary, Iain Duncan Smith. On 27 August 2015, the prime minister, David Cameron, announced a list of new creations of life peers, including Mone. Her inclusion drew criticism from other business leaders. Some Conservatives questioned her suitability for the House of Lords. The Scotsman reported that senior Scottish Conservatives also criticised Cameron's action, with an unnamed Conservative describing Mone as "a public relations creation, a personal brand rather than a serious businesswoman".

Mone was criticised on Twitter when her first vote in the House of Lords was to vote against a motion to delay government cuts to tax credits of around £1,300 a year for three million low-income families. Mone responded to the controversy by tweeting that people should "work hard" and not "look for excuses" for their own poverty. In October 2016 she said that she was wrong to support the cuts and she regretted the way she voted.

Attendance in House of Lords

In her maiden speech in the House of Lords, Mone stated: "I look forward to playing a full and active role in your lordships’ house". The Times reported in 2018 that in the previous year, Mone had only attended the House of Lords on 12% of the days in which it was sitting, missing important debates including on the Brexit bill. Her low attendance led SNP MSP Rona Mackay to describe her as the "Layabout Lady of Mayfair" and businessman Douglas Anderson, who had criticised her original appointment, called for her to resign. By early 2022, Mone had made only five speeches in the House of Lords and asked 22 written questions. As of December 2022, she had not spoken in a debate since March 2020 and had last voted in April 2022.

PPE Medpro controversy

In October 2020 it was revealed that PPE Medpro, a company led by Anthony Page, a business associate of Mone and her husband Doug Barrowman, had been awarded a contract for £122 million to supply personal protective equipment (PPE) to the NHS during the COVID-19 pandemic. Page resigned as secretary for MGM Media, the company that manages and receives payment for Mone's branding and media engagements and on the same day he formed Medpro. In October 2020, a spokeswoman for  Mone stated she "has no role or involvement in PPE Medpro", adding: "Mr Barrowman is also not involved in the company PPE Medpro and is not a Director or Shareholder." It later emerged that a second contract for £80 million was awarded to Medpro even earlier when the company was just 4 weeks old.

In November 2021, a Freedom of Information request revealed that Mone personally recommended the company to the government through its VIP fast-track lane for firms with political connections and that the company was awarded £200 million in government contracts. This high-priority process was set up in the early stages of the COVID-19 pandemic in order to bypass the normal competitive tender process for procurement that was considered urgent. It further emerged in January 2022 that Mone recommended Medpro for a government contract five days before the company had been formed. At the time, Mone's lawyers stated that she "was not connected to PPE Medpro in any capacity" but documents leaked to The Guardian revealed that a director of the company was a long term employee of Mone's husband's company. WhatsApp messages seen by The Guardian appeared to show Mone discussing the size of garments that formed part of a contract. Lawyers for Mone and her husband denied the allegations. 

Following a complaint by the Labour peer George Foulkes, the House of Lords commissioner for standards launched an investigation into the relationship between Mone and Medpro in January 2022. On 27 April 2022, Mone's homes in London and on the Isle of Man and associated business addresses were raided by the police, who have launched an investigation into potential fraud. The National Crime Agency is pursuing a tandem investigation into PPE Medpro. 

In November 2022, The Guardian reported that an Isle of Man trust, of which Mone and her adult children are beneficaries, had received £29 million originating from PPE Medpro via a series of offshore transactions involving Barrowman. Her lawyer had previously said she did not declare PPE Medpro in the House of Lords register of financial interests as "she did not benefit financially and was not connected to PPE Medpro in any capacity."

Mone also lobbied for LFI Diagnostics, a company established as a secret entity of her husband Barrowman's family office, Knox family office. A unnamed source told The Guardian that Mone was "in a class of her own in terms of the sheer aggression of her advocacy" for LFI Diagnostics. On 6 December 2022, Mone's spokesperson said she was taking a leave of absence from the House of Lords with immediate effect "in order to clear her name of the allegations that have been unjustly levelled against her."

On 19 December 2022 it emerged that the government would sue PPE Medpro for £122m plus costs. The government said that medical gowns which were supplied by the company "did not comply with the specification in the contract" and could not be used in the NHS. PPE Medpro said it would "rigorously" defend the claim.

Awards and recognition 
On 21 November 2002, Paisley University awarded her an honorary doctorate. Mone was appointed Officer of the Order of the British Empire (OBE) for her "services to the lingerie industry" in the 2010 New Year Honours.

After consultation with the College of Arms, on 30 September 2015, she was created a life peer as Baroness Mone, of Mayfair in the City of Westminster. She was introduced in the House of Lords on 15 October by fellow Conservative peers Lord Freud and Baroness Morris of Bolton.

She was recognised as one of the BBC's 100 women of 2017.

Personal life
Mone has appeared on a number of TV programmes, including The Apprentice and 71 Degrees North.

On 26 December 2018 Mone announced her engagement to Scottish businessman Douglas Barrowman. They were married on 29 November 2020.

In December 2021, a wealth manager of Indian heritage accused Mone of sending racist text messages to him after the two were involved in a 2019 yachting incident in Monaco, which resulted in the death of a person. He said that Mone called him "a waste of a man's white skin" via text. A spokesperson for Mone said she was not a racist and "Baroness Mone and her husband have built over 15 schools in Africa in the past three years"; this was followed by a message from her lawyers, who said that Mone could not access her messages and had no "detailed memory of them". Mone's spokesperson said it was "illogical she would have made such a comment or made it with the slightest racist intent as, at the time, she had no knowledge that the complainant was anything other than white British, as his appearance is 100% white, with a cut-glass English accent."

The allegations of racism were referred to the House of Lords Commissioner for Standards, but commissioners did not investigate the matter as Mone's comments were said in a personal capacity and not in her capacity as a member of the House of Lords. In January 2022, the Metropolitan Police announced they were investigating the incident after receipt of an allegation of a racially aggravated malicious communication.

Mone owns a luxury property in Glasgow which she claimed in a 2013 interview to Hello! magazine was once home to Albert Einstein, despite the fact he never lived in Glasgow.

References

External links 
Official Michelle Mone website
www.parliament.uk

1971 births
Living people
Scottish fashion designers
Officers of the Order of the British Empire
Businesspeople from Glasgow
People from Thorntonhall
Scottish Roman Catholics
Scottish businesspeople in fashion
Conservative Party (UK) life peers
Life peeresses created by Elizabeth II
British monarchists
21st-century Scottish businesspeople
BBC 100 Women
Converts to Roman Catholicism from Protestantism
Labour Party (UK) people
Politicians from Glasgow
Scottish Conservative Party politicians
British women fashion designers
21st-century British women politicians